The 1978 Italian Grand Prix was the 14th motor race of the 1978 Formula One season. It was held on 10 September 1978 at Monza. It was marred by the death of Ronnie Peterson following an accident at the start of the race.

With three races remaining, Mario Andretti (Lotus-Ford) led the World Drivers' Championship by 12 points from his team-mate Ronnie Peterson. Niki Lauda (Brabham-Alfa Romeo), in third place, was 28 points behind Andretti, and, with only 9 points for a win, could not overtake him.

Qualifying 
Andretti took pole position alongside Gilles Villeneuve (Ferrari), with Jean-Pierre Jabouille (Renault) in third place, Lauda in fourth and Peterson in fifth.

Pre-qualifying classification

Qualifying classification

Race

First start and Ronnie Peterson accident

The race started at 3:30pm Central European Time (UTC+1), On the warm up lap, Patrick Tambay went into the pits to have his gear-change mechanism looked at. The starter Gianni Restelli was overenthusiastic turning on the green lights before all the cars had lined up, that resulted in several cars in the middle of the field getting a jump on those at the front. The result was a funneling effect of the cars approaching the chicane, and the cars were tightly bunched together with little room for maneuver. James Hunt was overtaken on the right-hand side by Riccardo Patrese, and Hunt instinctively veered left and hit the rear right wheel of Peterson's Lotus 78, with Vittorio Brambilla, Hans-Joachim Stuck, Patrick Depailler, Didier Pironi, Derek Daly, Clay Regazzoni and Brett Lunger all involved in the ensuing melee. Peterson's Lotus went into the barriers hard on the right-hand side and caught fire. He was trapped, but Hunt, Regazzoni and Depailler managed to free him from the wreck before he received more than minor burns. He was dragged free and laid in the middle of the track fully conscious, but with severe leg injuries. It took 20 minutes before medical help was dispatched to the scene. Brambilla, who had been hit on the head by a flying wheel and rendered unconscious, and Peterson were taken to the Niguarda hospital in nearby Milan.

Delayed restart

Drivers were allowed to use spare cars for the race restart. Non-starters included Peterson and Brambilla who were taken to hospital, Stuck who was not allowed to restart due to him suffering from slight concussion due to him being struck on the head by a flying wheel, Pironi (as the Tyrrell team had one spare car and that was set up for Depailler) and Lunger who had no spare car available.

The race was due to be ready for a restart at 5:15pm. While driving from the pit lane to the grid, Jody Scheckter's Wolf lost a wheel and crashed at the second Lesmo curve, bending the Armco barrier that was situated right next to the track. Some of the drivers had seen the accident, got out of their cars and rushed across to race control to get the second start delayed as the Armco barriers were leaning over perilously where Scheckter struck it. Andretti, Hunt, Lauda, Carlos Reutemann and Emerson Fittipaldi all went to the spot where Scheckter crashed and upon inspection of the state of the barrier, they refused to start until the barrier was repaired, causing more delay. The barrier was later repaired and ready for the restart.

Second start and race recap 
Because of the amount of time clearing up the track after the shunt in the first start and the barrier being repaired plus Scheckter's crash prior to the second start. At 5:50pm, it was announced that the race would take place and the distance would be shortened from 52 laps to 40 laps to avoid sunset. The race was restarted at 6:15pm, Villeneuve overtook Andretti at the restart and at the end of the lap, both drivers were side by side but Villeneuve held on to the lead and they pulled away from Jabouille who was running third with Lauda behind him. After four laps, Regazzoni in the spare Shadow went to the pits as he was having his brakes looked at. Jabouille had engine problems after six laps and Lauda took on the pursuit, but race control gave Villeneuve and Andretti a one-minute penalty as they were judged to have jumped the start. Andretti took Villeneuve with only five laps remaining. With Jabouille having retired, Lauda finished third ahead of John Watson (Brabham), Carlos Reutemann (Ferrari), Jacques Laffite (Ligier-Matra) and Patrick Tambay (McLaren-Ford). Since all of those finished less than a minute behind, Andretti and Villeneuve were dropped to sixth and seventh place. Andretti had won the championship, but with Peterson in hospital, celebrations were muted. The race was also notable for the first finish for Nelson Piquet with a creditable ninth after dodging the Peterson wreckage in the first start.

Death of Ronnie Peterson 
At the hospital, Peterson's X-rays showed he had a total of twenty seven fractures in both legs, according to the newly appointed F1 doctor Sid Watkins in his autobiography "Life at the Limit" from 1996. After discussion with him, Peterson was sent to intensive care so that the surgeons could operate to stabilize the bones. There was some level of dispute between the doctors regarding whether all fractures should be immediately fixed or not. During the night, Peterson's condition worsened, and he was diagnosed with fat embolism. By morning he was in full kidney failure due to the embolism, and was declared dead at 9:55am on 11 September 1978.

Post-race reactions
As a result of the start line crash, a medical car would follow the cars on the opening lap of every Grand Prix. ABC Sports broadcaster Jim McKay who was covering the race said during the broadcast which was shown on Saturday "Later Peterson would die, but not until the next morning. Victory so long anticipated and so much earned, now tasted like ashes in Mario's mouth." A week later at the Michigan 150, Andretti was asked about Peterson and he said "His sincerity I learned to really appreciate that more than anything else and the man is competitive as he was with his skills and I found that this is something that many people in this business like because it's a very selfish business that's basis but he could share with me the basic of the car whatever he found, he changed something even if it was the better."

Classification 

† Peterson suffered severe leg trauma in a multi-car accident but was otherwise conscious. However, while in the hospital the night following the race he was diagnosed with a fat embolism, of which he died the following morning as a result.

Championship standings after the race

Drivers' Championship standings

Constructors' Championship standings

Note: Only the top five positions are included for both sets of standings.

References

External links 
 Report and Results - Grandprix.com encyclopedia

Italian Grand Prix
Italian Grand Prix
Grand Prix
Italian Grand Prix